Pennsbury Village is a borough in Allegheny County, Pennsylvania, United States. The population was 677 at the 2020 census.

History

Pennsbury is a unique borough in that it is entirely a municipality of condo-style houses, having been built in 1973. In 1976, there was a disagreement with Robinson Township over proposed sewage treatment fees, which triggered the self-government attempt. In 1977, it separated from the surrounding township and became an Allegheny County borough. The words of the Declaration of Secession included "that we can govern our affairs more effectively and equitable than a distant and disinterested authority". The first council of officials and a mayor were elected and took office in January, 1977.

Geography

Education
Pennsbury Village is served by the Montour School District.

Surrounding communities
Pennsbury Village is entirely surrounded by Robinson Township.

Demographics

As of the census of 2000, there were 738 people, 491 households, and 152 families living in the borough. The population density was 12,710.3 people per square mile (4,749.1/km2). There were 500 housing units at an average density of 8,611.3 per square mile (3,217.5/km2). The racial makeup of the borough was 95.93% White, 1.63% African American, 0.81% Native American, 0.81% Asian, 0.14% from other races, and 0.68% from two or more races. Hispanic or Latino of any race were 0.81% of the population.

There were 491 households, out of which 11.0% had children under the age of 18 living with them, 21.2% were married couples living together, 8.4% had a female householder with no husband present, and 69.0% were non-families. 61.9% of all households were made up of individuals, and 5.1% had someone living alone who was 65 years of age or older. The average household size was 1.50 and the average family size was 2.32.

In the borough the population was spread out, with 9.5% under the age of 18, 5.0% from 18 to 24, 50.4% from 25 to 44, 28.7% from 45 to 64, and 6.4% who were 65 years of age or older. The median age was 37 years. For every 100 females there were 68.1 males. For every 100 females age 18 and over, there were 64.1 males.

The median income for a household in the borough was $46,579, and the median income for a family was $55,125. Males had a median income of $42,222 versus $36,528 for females. The per capita income for the borough was $33,339. About 3.8% of families and 3.4% of the population were below the poverty line, including 6.6% of those under age 18 and 11.3% of those age 65 or over.

Government and politics

References

External links
Borough of Pennsbury Village official website

Populated places established in 1977
Boroughs in Allegheny County, Pennsylvania
Residential condominiums in the United States